is a Japanese football player. She plays for Nojima Stella Kanagawa Sagamihara and Japan national team.

Club career
Matsubara was born in Hokkaido on May 1, 1995. After graduating from Waseda University, she joined L.League club Nojima Stella Kanagawa Sagamihara in 2018.

National team career
In September 2012, Matsubara was selected Japan U-17 national team for 2012 U-17 World Cup. She played at 2 matches.

In February 2019, Matsubara was selected Japan national team for SheBelieves Cup. At this tournament, on February 27, she debuted as defensive midfielder against United States.

National team statistics

International goals
.''Scores and results list Japan's goal tally first.

References

External links

Japan Football Association

1995 births
Living people
Waseda University alumni
Association football people from Hokkaido
Japanese women's footballers
Japan women's international footballers
Nadeshiko League players
Nojima Stella Kanagawa Sagamihara players
Women's association football midfielders
Universiade silver medalists for Japan
Universiade medalists in football